The Ghost That Never Returns is a 1930 Soviet made part-sound drama film. It was directed by Abram Room based on a novel by Henri Barbusse.

It is preserved at the Library of Congress.

Plot 
The film follows protagonist José Real (Boris Ferdinandov) in his journey from prison to the real world. Real was imprisoned for life for trying to unionize a South American oilfield, and attempting a strike. After serving 10 years of his sentence, he is allowed one day to see his family, an honor from which he will not return. Unbeknownst to him, he is being followed by an agent with orders to assassinate him.

After hopping onto a train to meet his family, Real accidentally falls asleep, and misses his stop. Realizing this, he jumps from the train to try and get back to his stop. Enjoying his newfound freedom, Real once again falls asleep, this time on a boulder, before resuming his journey to his wife and child. He finally finds his house, which is empty of his wife. His father and son are there, however, and tell him of a new strike going on at the local Hillside Inn.

Real arrives at the strike, as does the agent trailing him and the police. Real is ordered to return to the prison. He declines, and declares he will not return. A firefight thus breaks out between the police, and the workers. The film ends as Real rushes home to brandish a gun to fight the police. As several workers are arrested and put in prison, they hear of Real leading the new strike.

Cast
Boris Ferdinandov - José Real
A. Filippov - Syn Khose
Karl Gurnyak - Rabochiy, chlen komiteta
Dmitriy Kara-Dmitriev - Shef agentov
Ivan Lavrov - Otets Khose
A. Repin - Soblaznitel
Maksim Shtraukh - Politseyskiy agent
Gavril Tereekhov - Santander, lyubovnik
Daniil Vvedenskiy - Nachalnik tyurmy

References

External links
The Ghost That Never Returns @ IMDb.com

1930 drama films
1930 films
Films based on French novels
Films directed by Abram Room
Soviet drama films
Soviet black-and-white films
1930s Russian-language films